Lorenzo Turchi-Floris is an Italian composer, conductor, pianist and teacher.

Biography
He graduated in piano, composition and orchestra conducting at the "Conservatorio di Musica Giuseppe Verdi" (Turin, Italy). He studied piano in Rome with Debora Varesco and then continued his studies in Russia at the Rachmaninov Musical Institute with Viktor K. Merzhanov. 
He has studied conducting, counterpoint, instrumentation and analysis at the Haute école de musique de Genève.

He teaches Piano at the Istituto Superiore di Studi Musicali G. Briccialdi of Terni.

His recordings as a pianist, composer and conductor have been published by Generason (France), SMB (France), Rendre Présent (France), SOTA (USA) and Brilliant Classics (Netherlands).

Conductor
In 1997 he created the Orchestre Symphonique du Mont-Blanc (OSMB), the first Symphonic Orchestra in the Haute-Savoie region in France. From 1998 to 2013 he has been the artistic director of its Orchestra and Choir.

Since 2008 he is the artistic director of the Musicfor international and he devotes much of his musical activity to the development and support of the most disadvantaged areas in the world (such as Mozambique, Haiti, Angola, and South Africa) planning music schools.

Composer
He has composed the music of "Story of a night pianist", a site-specific interdisciplinary performance by Anna Buonomo.

In 2019 he has produced, together with Ambassador Stefano Baldi, a cultural show entitled "Journey in Italy" to get to know some of the Italian Regions through their popular musical tradition arranged in a classical key for tenor and piano.

He has composed the music for the short film "Faraday's Cage" directed by Terry Braun.

Awards
As a pianist, he has won prizes in several music competitions: Pineto National Competition (1994 - Italy), Tortona International Competition (1994 - Italy), Detroit International Competition (1993 - USA), Rome AIDI Competition (1992 - Italy), Gargano National Competition (1991 - Italy), Matera National Competition (1991 - Italy), Ciampino National Competition (1988 – Italy).

In 2017 he received the “Baton for Peace” award from UNICEF, symbolizing humanitarian commitment, for his efforts to expand access to music for everyone through the international organization Musicfor.

Works
Rondo Latino for marimba and string orchestra (2019)
Evocazioni Notturne for piano and string orchestra (2018)
Prelude and Fugue for guitar and string orchestra dedicated to Alessio Nebiolo (2017)
Aspettando Anninora for piano and string orchestra (2016)
Piece for String Orchestra for string orchestra (2014)
Ave Maria for choir SATB (2013)
Tarantango for piano and string orchestra (2012)
Presentiments for string orchestra (2011)
Il respiro dei sassi for petit ensemble (2011)
Tempo di Concerto for piano and string orchestra (2010)

Discography (as composer)
Piece for String Orchestra in I Musici estensi - Ritorno - Symphony of the Americas Summerfest 2013 (2013)
Tempo di concerto for piano and string orchestra and Tarantino in Mission Chamber Orchestra of Rome - RomaAmor - Symphony of the Americas Summerfest 2012 (2012)

References

External links
 

Living people
Italian male conductors (music)
Italian composers
21st-century Italian conductors (music)
21st-century Italian male musicians
Italian male pianists
Male classical pianists
Year of birth missing (living people)